CNV may refer to:
Chinese New Version, a Chinese language Bible translation
Choroidal neovascularization in ophthalmology
 City of North Vancouver in British Columbia, as opposed to its surrounding District of North Vancouver
Christelijk Nationaal Vakverbond in Dutch Trade Unions
Copy number variation in genetics
contingent negative variation  in evoked potentials
Cranial nerve V, also known as the trigeminal nerve
 Communication Non Violente, the French version of the acronym NVC Non Violent Communication